Aby or ABY may refer to:

Places
 Aby, Ivory Coast
 Aby Lagoon, a lagoon in Ivory Coast
 Abyy or Aby, Sakha Republic, Russia
 Aby Lowland
 Aby, Lincolnshire, a village in England, UK
 Åby, Norrköping Municipality, Sweden
 Åby, Växjö Municipality, Sweden

Transport
 Ashburys railway station's station code
 Southwest Georgia Regional Airport's IATA airport code

Other uses
 Aby (film), a 2017 Malayalam-language Indian film
 Aby (name), a given name and surname, including a list of people with the name
 Abyssinian cat, or Abys, a shorthair cat breed
 Aneme Wake language's ISO 639-3 code
 ABY, a system of measuring fictional dates in Star Wars relative to the Battle of Yavin

See also
 Aaby (disambiguation) (for Åby)
 Abby (disambiguation)
 Aby-Mohoua, Ivory Coast